Admiral Sir Edward Bridges Rice,  (30 October 1819 – 30 October 1902) was a Royal Navy officer who went on to be Commander-in-Chief, The Nore.

Naval career
The son of Edward Royd Rice MP and the brother of Admiral Sir Ernest Rice, Edward Rice joined the Royal Navy in 1832. He became mate in 1839, and was on board  which took part in operations on the Yangtze River in 1842 during the First Opium War. After promotion to lieutenant in 1844 and commander in 1850, he then commanded a flotilla of boats on the Irrawaddy River in 1852 during the Second Anglo-Burmese War. Rice had charge of the seamen and naval guns on shore at the capture of Prome, for which he received the official thanks of the Governor-General in Council.

Promoted to captain in 1855, he commanded  at Sevastopol during the closing stages of the Crimean War. Promoted to flag rank as rear-admiral in 1873, he was appointed Second-in-Command of the Mediterranean Fleet in 1875, Admiral Superintendent of Malta Dockyard in 1876, then promoted to vice-admiral in 1878. He was Commander-in-Chief, The Nore from 1882 until he retired in 1884, and was promoted to admiral three days after his retirement. He was appointed a Companion of the Order of the Bath (CB) in 1881, and promoted to Knight Commander (KCB) in the 1887 Golden Jubilee Honours list.

He lived at Dane Court in Dover and in retirement was Deputy Lieutenant of Kent.

He died at Dane Court on 30 October 1902, aged 83.

Family
Rice married in 1864 Cecilia Caroline Harcourt, daughter of Rev. William Vernon Harcourt, of Nuneham Park; they had one son.

References

|-

1819 births
1902 deaths
Royal Navy admirals
Knights Commander of the Order of the Bath
Deputy Lieutenants of Kent
People from Godmersham